Michał Wielhorski may refer to:

 Michał Wielhorski (elder), 1730 – 1814
 Michał Wielhorski (younger), 1755–1805
 Michał Wielhorski (composer) (Mikhail Vielgorsky), 1787-1856